Anton Paul Devcich (born 28 September 1985) is a New Zealand former international cricketer, who played in limited over internationals. A left-handed batsman who occasionally bowls left-arm orthodox spin, at the domestic level he plays for Northern Districts.

Career

Domestic cricket
Devcich made his first-class debut against Otago in 2005 for Northern Districts. Batting at 9, he scored 94 not out, including 15 boundaries, in the first innings, but he finished the match wicketless. He played three further first-class matches in the 2004–05 season but in five innings failed to pass 30.

He made List A and Twenty20 debuts the following season but has been unable to secure a first-team place with only sporadic appearances in all formats. In the 2017–18 Super Smash, he was the leading run-scorer, with 343 runs in ten matches.

In April 2018, he was named the Super Smash Player of the Year at the New Zealand Cricket Awards. In June 2018, he was awarded a contract with Northern Districts for the 2018–19 season.

He was the leading run-scorer for the Nangarhar Leopards in the 2018–19 Afghanistan Premier League, with 270 runs in nine matches. He was the leading wicket-taker for Northern Districts in the 2018–19 Ford Trophy, with twelve dismissals in seven matches.

In July 2019, he was selected to play for the Edinburgh Rocks in the inaugural edition of the Euro T20 Slam cricket tournament. However, the following month the tournament was cancelled. In January 2020, Devcich conceded 6 sixes in an over against Leo Carter of Canterbury, a moment he referred to as one of the worst of his cricketing career.

International Cricket
Devcich represented New Zealand at youth level, making five appearances at the Under-19 Cricket World Cup in 2004.

Black Caps
In September 2013, Devcich was named in the Black Caps limited-overs squad to tour Bangladesh. On 29 October he made ODI debut in the first ODI of the series, and eight days later he hit 59 off just 31 deliveries in his T20 International debut.

Overall, Devcich played 12 ODIs and four T20 Internationals for New Zealand.

Retirement
Devcich announced his retirement from representative cricket in July 2021.

References

1985 births
Living people
New Zealand cricketers
Northern Districts cricketers
New Zealand One Day International cricketers
Lahore Qalandars cricketers
New Zealand Twenty20 International cricketers
St Kitts and Nevis Patriots cricketers
Cricketers from Hamilton, New Zealand
Trinbago Knight Riders cricketers
Nangarhar Leopards cricketers
Sydney Thunder cricketers
New Zealand people of Croatian descent
North Island cricketers